Rakhine may refer to:
 Rakhine State, in Myanmar
 Rakhine people, a Tibeto-Burman ethnic group
 Rakhine language, a Sino-Tibetan language spoken by the Rakhine people

Language and nationality disambiguation pages